Floyd Snider (ca. 1924 – 12 February 1976) was a former Canadian ice hockey player. He played between 1946 and 1954 for the Fife Flyers in the Scottish National League. He was inducted to the British Ice Hockey Hall of Fame in 1951.

External links
British Ice Hockey Hall of Fame entry

British Ice Hockey Hall of Fame inductees
Canadian ice hockey defencemen
Fife Flyers players
1920s births
1976 deaths
Date of birth missing
Place of death missing
Canadian expatriate ice hockey players in Scotland
Ice hockey people from Ontario
Sportspeople from Kingston, Ontario